Boston's Finest is an American reality television series on TNT which chronicled the daily operations of the Boston Police Department. The series was green-lit on May 11, 2012, with the premiere on February 27, 2013. It was announced in May 2013 that the series had been renewed for a six-episode second season.

Cast
The show followed officers of four different units of the Boston Police Department.

Gang Unit (Day)
 Manny Canuto
 Diamantino "D" Araujo
 Skye Robinson
 Robert "Twitch" Twitchell

Patrol Unit
 Jenn Penton
 Pat Rogers
 Tim Stanton

Gang Unit (Night)
 Terrique Chambers
 Greg McCormick

Fugitive Unit

 Sgt Ryan Mason
 Michelle Williams
 Brian Albert
 Winston DeLeon
 Greg Dankers
 Sean Joyce
 Sgt Mike Sullivan
 Joe Marerro
Alison Fanelli
 Mike McHugh

Episodes

Season 1 (2013)

Season 2 (2013–14)

Reception
Boston's Finest received generally favorable reviews, with a score of 75 on Metacritic. Allison Keene of The Hollywood Reporter notes that "fans of police procedurals will be drawn to the show's fly-on-the-wall feeling, with its engaging cases and easy flow of law enforcement lingo. Though Boston's Finest hints at the darkest corners of American street life, its real aim seems to be a showcase of local heroism."

The Boston Globe'''s Matthew Gilbert criticized the show for its lack of action, stating "Boston's Finest may be too aimless and pointless to inspire loyal viewing. It can be a little dull over the long haul, perhaps because the action we see isn’t particularly interesting and the family lives of the cops are relatively incident-free." Gilbert also praised the show for its focus on the personal lives of the officers themselves, "The one subplot in Boston's Finest'' that resonates most of all belongs to Officer Penton, who has a personal reason for her interest in drug arrests... We get a clear and touching sense of how Penton's family situation fuels her professional life, and how inspiration and greatness can be born of pain."

References

External links

2010s American reality television series
2013 American television series debuts
2014 American television series endings
English-language television shows
Television shows set in Boston
TNT (American TV network) original programming
Documentary television series about policing